Tăuteu (also Tăuteni) is a commune in Bihor County, Crișana, Romania with a population of 4,063 people. It is composed of five villages: Bogei (Bozsaly), Chiribiș (Bisztraterebes), Ciutelec (Cséhtelek), Poiana (Rétimalomtanya) and Tăuteu.

References

Communes in Bihor County
Localities in Crișana